"Santa Looked a Lot Like Daddy" is a Christmas song co-written and recorded by Buck Owens. After its recording in 1965, the song has been covered by several country music artists, including Garth Brooks, Travis Tritt, and Brad Paisley.

History
The song was released on November 8, 1965, with "All I Want for Christmas, Dear, Is You" on the B-side. It placed at number 2 on the yearly Christmas singles chart issued by Billboard at the time.

The song is about a child who has sneaked downstairs to catch a glimpse of Santa where the child sees his father in a Santa costume.

Cover versions
In 1992, Garth Brooks covered the song on his Christmas album Beyond the Season, produced by Allen Reynolds for Liberty Records. However, it did not chart from Christmas airplay until January 1998, when it reached number 56. The physical single release had "The Old Man's Back in Town", with which Brooks charted at number 48 on the same chart in 1992, on the B-side.

Also in 1992, Travis Tritt covered both the single and its B-side for his Christmas album A Travis Tritt Christmas: Loving Time of the Year.

In 1995, The Tractors included a cover on their album Have Yourself a Tractors Christmas.

In 1998, Paul Brandt included a cover on his album A Paul Brandt Christmas: Shall I Play for You?

Psychobilly trio The Reverend Horton Heat recorded a cover for their 2005 album We Three Kings.

Brad Paisley covered it in 2006 for his Christmas album Brad Paisley Christmas on Arista Nashville under the production of Frank Rogers. Paisley's version peaked at number 49 on the country charts in January 2007.

Also in 2006, Billy "Crash" Craddock included a cover on his album Billy "Crash" Craddock's Christmas Favorites.

In 2011, rock band Bowling for Soup included a version of the song on their album Merry Flippin’ Christmas Vol. 1.

In 2013, the cast of Duck Dynasty released Duck the Halls: A Robertson Family Christmas.  "Santa Looked a Lot Like Daddy" was included as a bonus track on the Walmart exclusive edition.

Chart performance

Buck Owens

Garth Brooks

Brad Paisley

References

1965 songs
1965 singles
1998 singles
2006 singles
American Christmas songs
Garth Brooks songs
Buck Owens songs
Brad Paisley songs
Christmas novelty songs
Songs about Santa Claus
Songs about fathers
Arista Nashville singles
Capitol Records singles
Liberty Records singles
Song recordings produced by Ken Nelson (American record producer)
Song recordings produced by Allen Reynolds
Song recordings produced by Frank Rogers (record producer)
Songs written by Buck Owens
Songs written by Don Rich